Walter Daniel Leake (May 20, 1762November 6, 1825) was a judge, U.S. senator, and governor of Mississippi. He served as a United States Senator from Mississippi (1817–1820), as a justice in 1821, and as third Governor of Mississippi (1822–1825). He was the first Governor of Mississippi to die in office.

Biography

Early life
Walter Leake was born on May 20, 1762, in Albemarle County in the Colony of Virginia. He was the son of Captain Mask Leake and nephew of Rev. Samuel Leake (Princeton University graduate and a member of the first Board of Trustees of Hampden–Sydney College), an ancestor of Senator John McCain of Arizona. Walter Leake was descended from John Leake.

Career
He served in the United States Senate from 1817 to 1820. He was appointed to the Mississippi Supreme Court in 1821, and went on to serve as the Governor of Mississippi from 1822 to 1825.

Personal life
His daughter, Susan Wingfield Leake, married Henry Goodloe Johnston of Spotsylvania County, Virginia in 1807 and was an ancestor of Haley Barbour.

Legacy
Leake County, Mississippi, as well as Leakesville, Mississippi are named for him.

See also
List of justices of the Supreme Court of Mississippi

References

1762 births
1825 deaths
People from Albemarle County, Virginia
Mississippi Democratic-Republicans
Governors of Mississippi
United States senators from Mississippi
Democratic-Republican Party United States senators
Democratic-Republican Party state governors of the United States
Leake County, Mississippi
Justices of the Mississippi Supreme Court